Lonnie Lee Hammargren (born December 25, 1937) is an American politician and a retired neurosurgeon. He was elected a member of the non-partisan board of regents for the Nevada System of Higher Education, an office he held from 1988 to 1994; he is the former 31st lieutenant governor of Nevada, serving from 1995 to 1999 as a member of the Republican Party. As of 2022, he is the most recent Nevada lieutenant governor to serve under governor from the opposing party, having served with Democrat Bob Miller.

He is also known for his "eclectic collection of artifacts, including old casino signs and an Apollo space capsule".

Career

Medical career
Hammargren is a neurosurgeon first licensed in 1971. Lonnie spent several years as a NASA flight surgeon. He also operated on boxer Duk Koo Kim in November 1982, following Kim's loss to Ray Mancini; Kim died as a result of his injuries in the fight.

Following Roy Horn's near-fatal tiger attack in 2003, Hammargren spoke up to correct misinformation in the press about the procedure Horn (of Siegfried & Roy) had received.

According to Hammargren, he gave up surgery in 2005, when the cost for his malpractice insurance was raised to $275,000/year; in 2009, as part of a medical malpractice settlement, he agreed to give up surgery permanently, though he retained his medical license.

Political career
From 1988 to 1994,
Hammargren was a member of the board of regents for the Nevada System of Higher Education.

Hammargren was the lieutenant governor of Nevada from 1995 to 1999. He lost his election bid in the primaries for that office again in 2006.

As of 2008, Hammargren was the honorary consul for Belize.

Personal life
Hammargren built his house, Castillo del Sol, in 1969. Since then it has become a museum to Vegas' past. The house is usually open for tours on Nevada Day. Among his latest acquisitions is the High Roller roller coaster from the Stratosphere. His home has been featured on the Travel Channel's show Vegas VIP Homes.

Hammargren married his wife Sandy in 1989, an event which in part was filmed for Lifestyles of the Rich and Famous.

On March 31, 2007, Hammargren held an "Awake Wake" for himself, in which he had a mock funeral service, a New Orleans style Jazz Funeral March back to his house, and buried himself in a sarcophagus in the Egyptian tomb in his garage. He emerged an hour later. In 2008, he began building a replica Orion spacecraft to add to the collection.

On December 18, 2016, Hammargren was featured on an episode of the A&E series Hoarders. In the episode, it was revealed Hammargren had spent an estimated $10 million on his collections and was $750,000 in debt. He sold some items at auction for a net gain of slightly over $4,000, which he planned to use to write his autobiography.

References

External links

1937 births
Living people
Lieutenant Governors of Nevada
American neurosurgeons
Nevada Republicans
People from Harris, Minnesota
People from the Las Vegas Valley
Physicians from Nevada